The Macomb Sports and Expo Center is a 2,800-seat indoor arena and convention center located in Warren, Michigan, on the South Campus of Macomb Community College.  It is used for the college's athletic programs, trade shows and conventions (The arena features  of floor space) and other special events.

The Sports and Expo Center also features a concessions area, tartan flooring that can withstand 4,000 pounds per square inch, registration and office space, and an adjoining meeting room.  It can accommodate five basketball courts, three tennis courts, five volleyball courts as well as an indoor track.

External links
Official website
Macomb Community College athletics

Convention centers in Michigan
Indoor arenas in Michigan
Sports venues in Michigan
Buildings and structures in Macomb County, Michigan
Sports venues in Metro Detroit
Warren, Michigan
College basketball venues in the United States
Basketball venues in Michigan
College volleyball venues in the United States